was a private women's college in Machida, Tokyo, Japan. The predecessor of the school was founded in 1888, and it was chartered as a junior college in 1956. In 1995 TJK entered into an agreement with The School for International Training to create an English medium degree program. In 2002 it became a four-year liberal arts college with a small student body of no more than 480 pupils.

Students graduating from TJKC receive a bachelor's degree in International Liberal Arts.

In May 2012 it was announced that the university would stop recruiting new students from spring 2013, and would close down permanently after the last of the current students graduate in March 2016. The declining birth rate in Japan and intense competition from other universities were both cited as reasons for the school's closure.

References

External links
  

Educational institutions established in 1877
Universities and colleges in Tokyo
Western Metropolitan Area University Association
Defunct private universities and colleges in Japan
1877 establishments in Japan